Kalateh-ye Abu ol Qasem (also Romanized as Kalāteh-ye Abū ol Qāsem; also known as Kalāteh-ye Ab ol Qāsem) is a village in Salehabad Rural District, Salehabad County, Razavi Khorasan Province, Iran. At the 2006 census, its population was 413, in 92 families.

References 

Populated places in   Torbat-e Jam County